Chaouia-Ouardigha was formerly one of the sixteen regions of Morocco from 1997 to 2015. It was situated in north-central Morocco in the historical region of Chaouia. It covered an area of 7,010 km² and had a population of 1,893,950 (2014 census). The capital was Settat.

The last Wali (governor) of the region was Mohamed Moufakkir.

Dissolution
Moroccan regions were reorganized in September 2015: Khouribga Province joined Béni Mellal-Khénifra, while the other three provinces were incorporated into Casablanca-Settat.

Administrative divisions
The region was made up of the following provinces:

 Ben Slimane Province
 Berrechid Province
 Khouribga Province
 Settat Province

Cities

 Ben Slimane 
 Bouznika 
 Khouribga 
 Oued Zem 
 Bejaad 
 Boujniba 
 Boulanouare 
 Hattane 
 Berrechid 
 Ben Ahmed 
 El Gara 
 El Borouj 
 Oulad Abbou 
 Deroua 
 Oulad M'Rah 
 Sidi Rahel Chatai 
 Oulad Hriz Sahel 
 Loulad 
 Ras El Ain 
 Soualem 
 Oulad Said 
 Guisser

References

Former regions of Morocco